The Ma-20 or Vía de Cintura is a Spanish freeway that bypasses the city of Palma de Mallorca. It is 11 km long, and was built in 1990 to reduce traffic in the city centre.

References 

Palma de Mallorca
Roads in Spain